Plaza de San Francisco (Saint Francis Square) may refer to:
Plaza San Francisco, La Paz, Bolivia
Plaza de San Francisco, Quito, Ecuador
Plaza de San Francisco, Seville, Spain
Plaza de San Francisco de Asís, Havana, Cuba